The Testaments of the Three Patriarchs is another name for the collection formed by the following three apocryphal works of the Hebrew Scriptures:

Testament of Abraham
Testament of Isaac
Testament of Jacob

These are generally considered important to the Abrahamic Faiths of Christianity, Judaism, and Islam. The Greek texts were published together as a scholarly collection by M. R. James in 1892.

References

Apocrypha
1st-century books
2nd-century books
Old Testament pseudepigrapha
Jewish apocrypha
Apocalyptic literature
Texts in Koine Greek
Roman Egypt